Anterior nucleus may refer to:
 Anterior hypothalamic nucleus
 Anterior nuclei of thalamus